Altıntel Port ( Altıntel Tank ve Terminal İşletmeleri A.Ş.) is a tank terminal and port located in Kocaeli/GEBZE, Dilovası OSB Organized Industrial Zone of Turkey. 
 It was established in 1987 for the storage of liquid chemical materials.
 Its primary customer is Arkem Chemicals, who started renting storage tanks in 1990's and took over the company in 2008.

Info
Dimensions:
 60,000 m3 storage area in 53 tanks.
 120,000 m2 owned land in Dilovası Organized Industrial Zone
 250 m long jetty.
 Member of Turklim

External links
www.altintel.com

References 
 https://web.archive.org/web/20110216194329/http://www.mastership.com/terminals.php?id=37

Transport companies established in 1987
Ports and harbours of Turkey
1987 establishments in Turkey